Destruction '08 was a professional wrestling pay-per-view (PPV) event promoted by New Japan Pro-Wrestling (NJPW). The event took place on October 13, 2008, in Tokyo, at Ryōgoku Kokugikan. The event featured nine matches (including one dark match), three of which were contested for championships. All Japan Pro Wrestling representatives Hiroshi Yamato, Kai and Satoshi Kojima, as well as the reigning IWGP Heavyweight Champion Keiji Mutoh, took part in the event as outsiders. It was the second event under the Destruction name.

Production

Storylines
Destruction '08 featured nine professional wrestling matches that involved different wrestlers from pre-existing scripted feuds and storylines. Wrestlers portrayed villains, heroes, or less distinguishable characters in the scripted events that built tension and culminated in a wrestling match or series of matches.

Event
During the event, No Limit (Tetsuya Naito and Yujiro) won the IWGP Junior Heavyweight Tag Team Championship for the first time by defeating Prince Prince (Minoru and Prince Devitt), while Pro Wrestling Zero1's Masato Tanaka lost the World Heavyweight Championship to Yuji Nagata, ending his year-long reign. In the main event, Keiji Mutoh made his fourth successful defense of the IWGP Heavyweight Championship against Shinsuke Nakamura.

Results

References

External links
 The official New Japan Pro-Wrestling website

2008
2008 in professional wrestling
Events in Tokyo
October 2008 events in Japan
Professional wrestling in Tokyo